This is a list of universities and colleges in Yunnan Province.

Note: Institutions without full-time bachelor programs are not listed.

See also
Greater Mekong Sub-region Academic and Research Network (GMSARN)
Yunnan Provincial Library

References
Yunnan Institutions Admitting International Students (China Scholarship Council, December 4, 2008)

 
Yunnan